Josef Antonín Štěpán or Joseph Anton Steffan ( – ) was a Bohemian-Austrian classical era composer and harpsichordist.

Steffan was born in Kopidlno, near Hradec Králové, Bohemia in March 1726, the son of a schoolmaster and church organist. In 1741 he fled from the Prussian army to Vienna. He received his first musical lessons from his father but, in Vienna, he studied with Schilck and later became a student of Georg Christoph Wagenseil. He became the piano teacher of Maria Carolina and Marie Antoinette. In 1775, he contracted an eye disease which left him almost blind. He gave up his position at the court, but continued to compose. He died in Vienna in April 1797.

Works
Steffan's compositional output includes sacred works and chamber music (especially piano music). In particular he wrote caprices, harpsichord sonatas and concertos. Specific works include:

 6 caprices for piano
 6 concertos for harpsichord and harp with violin, cello, flutes and horns, Op. 3, No. 1-6
 11 variations on an aria by Johann Christian Bach
 Collection of German songs for the piano
 Concerto for two alto recorders and basso continuo in F major
 Divertimenti, Op. 1, Nos. 1-6
 Divertimento for two pianos, two violins and bass in E flat major (originally attributed to Haydn, Hob: XIV: Es1)
 Divertimento in B-flat major
 Minuets for piano
 Piano Concerto in B-flat major
 Piano Trio in C major
 Sonata in A major
 Sonata in B-flat major
 Sonata in D major
 Sonata in E major
 Sonata in G major

References 
Picton, Howard J.: The Life and Works of Joseph Anton Steffan (1726 - 1797): with special reference to his keyboard concertos. 2 volumes. Garland Pub. 1989.

External links 

1726 births
1797 deaths
Blind classical musicians
Austrian Classical-period composers
Austrian male classical composers
Czech male classical composers
German Bohemian people
People from Jičín District
Pupils of Georg Christoph Wagenseil
18th-century classical composers
18th-century Austrian male musicians
Blind people
Czech people with disabilities